San Benedetto del Tronto is a city and comune in Marche, Italy. Part of an urban area with 100,000 inhabitants, it is one of the most densely populated areas along the Adriatic Sea coast. It is the most populated city in Province of Ascoli Piceno, with 46,957 (November 2022). Its port is one of the biggest on the Adriatic; it is the most important centre of Riviera of the Palms, with over 8,000 Phoenix canariensis, Washingtonia and P. sylvestris plants.

Geography

San Benedetto del Tronto rises on the shores of the Adriatic Sea and is located about 28 km east of Ascoli Piceno. It is the southernmost coastal town in the Marche region. The municipal territory extends for 25.41 km² and has the conformation of a coastal hill, with an altitude level between 0 and 282 height above sea level in the "Barattelle" contrada, it extends for 9.3 km along the coast of the middle Adriatic, of which 1.7 km in the protected natural area of the "Sentina". 
The city has an ancient nucleus (the "high country" or "su dèntrë" in Sambenedettese) on a modest relief not far from the sea, at the foot of which develops the original settlement of the most recent part "Navy". This is crossed by the Albula torrent and has developed over the years up to the river Tronto, to the south, incorporating the locality Porto d'Ascoli, while at north it joins with the Ischia district of Grottammare, with which it constitutes a single urban agglomeration that reaches almost until Tesino.
Southwest following the river bank Tronto merges with the Centobuchi, a frazione of Monteprandone. The municipality borders with Acquaviva Picena, Grottammare, Martinsicuro (TE) and Monteprandone.

The municipality of San Benedetto del Tronto and the neighboring municipalities of Grottammare, Acquaviva Picena, Monteprandone, Colonnella and Martinsicuro are a single urban entity there being a solution of continuity between the settlements. This agglomeration has undergone a considerable and constant development since the post-war period to the present day: in 1951 it had 47.337 inhabitants, 70.140 in 1971, 96.012 in 2007 and 100.611 in July 2010 distributed on a territory of 125 km2 and with a population density of 805 ab / km2.

However, the Metropolitan area (or region) of San Benedetto del Tronto, based on commuter flows and identified with the 'Functional Urban Regions' (FURs) methodology, is much larger. According to this methodology, all the neighboring municipalities that have at least 10% commuting rate towards it must be aggregated to the metropolitan pole. The metropolitan area of San Benedetto del Tronto thus reaches a population of 175,818 inhabitants, distributed in 23 municipalities within a radius of 15 km (including Martinsicuro, Grottammare, Alba Adriatica, Monteprandone and Tortoreto) from the city over a territory of 472 km2 and with a population density of 366 inhabitants / km2.

Climate
San Benedetto enjoys a particularly benign climate Mediterranean, with  winters mild (7 °C or so of seasonal medium), and they are moderately rainy, but snow often makes its appearance, also managing to periodically cover the city with a moderate white covering. This event is favored by the establishment of an active depression on the Ionian, which draws cold air from the Balkans. In the months between December and February, the "sambendettese" coast, like the entire Adriatic coast, is under the influence of currents from the northeast or the east, from the Buran, a typical wind of the East European Plain, bringing cold and frost characterized by discrete accumulations of snow on the coasts. The snowfall of 12 March 1956 and the relative cold wave represent a meteorological event of particular importance, it was called the "nevone".  Other snow phenomena of significant importance were in January 1985 and 1986, ale recent snowfalls of 2012,  2018.  The hot Summer's, but not sultry (about 23 °C of seasonal average), rarely exceed maximum temperatures over 32 °C.  The average annual temperature is about 15 °C while the Precipitation are generally between 700 and 800 mm.

History

San Benedetto del Tronto was a martyr and a soldier born in Cupra during the reign of Roman Emperor Diocletian. Shortly thereafter, following the edict of Constantine in 313 AD, some believers built a chapel around the tomb. Since then, San Benedetto has been highly revered by locals. He later built a small church which included an apse facing the east and its entrance facing the west, in accordance with the early Christian tradition that the east, where the sun rises, and the sunrise is symbolic of Christ's resurrection. Historians argue that archaeological findings indicate Roman origins, linking San Benedetto to the ancient city of Alba Picena on the right bank of the Albula river.

The first document which indicated the name of the village dates from 998. The document was an act concerning the investiture of the benefice of SS. Vincent and Anastasius in the territory of Acquaviva Piceno by Hubert bishop of Fermo. The document contains the phrase "Pede sive terra et silva Sancti Benedicti", referring to the city. In 1211, Emperor Otto IV granted the territories ranging from the Tronto River to the Potenza river to the town of Fermo. In 1245, Emperor Frederick II granted Ascoli Piceno a stretch of coast between the Ragnola river and Tronto river to build a fortified port. In the following years, there were disputes between Ascoli and Fermo. In 1478, there was a plague epidemic which decimated the city's population. The area remained virtually uninhabited until refugees from Romagna repopulated San Benedetto where they were granted land leases. From the 16th century until the 19th century, the Turks repeatedly invaded the city where they captured sailors and forced them into slavery. Since 1650, the urban center expanded beyond the city walls. In 1754, the first marine suburbs, Sant'Antonio da Padova and Marina, were created. In 1860, the "Cacciatori delle Alpi" freed the city from the dominion of the church. The Royal Decree giving San Benedetto the "del Tronto" attribute was in 1896. In 1936, the village of Porto d'Ascoli was absorbed into the city of San Benedetto del Tronto.

During Second World War, the city suffered 144 air raids and 6 naval bombardments. Following the end of the war, the city's economy and businesses prospered. Fishing became a cornerstone of the local economy and in the 1960s and 1970s, the city became one of the largest national fishing ports. After the war, San Benedetto became a tourist destination on the Adriatic coast.

Main sights

Gualtieri Tower
The Gualtieri Tower (Torrione) is an old observatory dating back to the 12th–13th century located on the highest and oldest part of the city known as San Benedetto Alta.

Monument to the fisherman
This statue is located at the point where the waterfront joins the southern dock of the harbor basin and reproduces the fishermen's estate during storms, when, to draw attention to the danger deriving from the looming fog over the sea, they used the trumpet. It is the work of Cleto Capponi, a Grottammarese artist.

The Jonathan seagull monument

Created by the artist Mario Lupo in 1986, the monument to the seagull Jonathan Livingston Seagull, protagonist of the book by Richard Bach, rises along the southern pier promenade, the one that was renamed The Jonathan's way. The work, projected for 10 meters, encloses the life of seagulls and water in a blue circle. It is the symbol of the generous industriousness and tenacity typical of seafarers, people used to face and overcome obstacles and difficulties silently.

Museum of the Sea Museum
The "Polo del Mare" museum complex is composed of five sections: the "Augusto Capriotti" Fish Museum, the Amphora Museum, the Marche Marine Civilization Museum, the Truentinum Antiquarium and the Sea Picture Gallery. The first four are located in the Wholesale Fish Market area. The Pinacoteca del Mare instead is located inside the Palazzo Piacentini.

"Augusto Capriotti" Fish Museum 
It is among the most important museums in the Piceno area. Named after the distinguished Sambenedese scientist Augusto Capriotti, inaugurated in 1956 it now includes over 9,000 specimens divided into: fish, crustaceans, molluscs, cetacea, echinoderms, coelenterates and fossils. Also interesting is the library containing more than 1,000 volumes including rare texts of historical and scientific value.

Museum of Amphorae 
Housed near the port, it represents a unique collection of amphoras of disparate ages (Canaanite, Phoenician, Punics, Greek, Roman and Byzantine) collected throughout the Mediterranean from the Sambenedetti fishing boats that they practiced bottom trawling, a technique that had not been permitted for years, which made it possible to recover these lost finds from past civilizations.

Museo d'Arte sul Mare (MAM) 

The Museo d'Arte sul Mare (MAM) is a permanent open-air museum that stretches over 1,150 meters along the 'Molo sud' (walkway) (called  Jonathan's street ). It contains 195 artworks, of which 170 are sculptures made on the faces of the breakwater blocks of travertine lined up along the walk and 25 murals. The artworks have been created over the years by 164 sculptors and wall painters coming from 37 nations of five continents, guests of the International Art Symposium " Festival dell'Arte sul Mare" .

The course

The historic Viale Secondo Moretti, built at the beginning of the thirties of the last century by the engineer Luigi Onorati as part of the project that led to the construction of the waterfront, located in the city center, perpendicular to the beginning of the northern waterfront, has been for decades now, the meeting place of the Sambenedettese population and the surrounding area. Pedestrian area, recently renovated, home to the city's historic premises and numerous commercial activities, for some years now it has been enriched by a collection of works of modern art, in particular sculptures, by Ugo Nespolo, Enrico Baj, Mark Kostabi, Paolo Consorti, Marco Lodola, Paolo Annibali.

The center of the course, a key meeting place of the town, is the Giorgini square (or Giorgini rotunda), dedicated to Carlo Giorgini, one of the most beloved mayors of the city, located at the intersection of the end of Viale Secondo Moretti and the north start of the waterfront. The fountain located in the center of the square has now become a symbol of the city.

Seafront

In 1931, on the project of the engineer Luigi Onorati, the promenade was built which, still today, as well as being an essential means of communication, is the center of San Benedetto. Considered disproportionate at the time of construction, it has a roadway with a total width of 30 meters and starts from the Giorgini roundabout (the rotunda), at the end of the central Viale Moretti, and, in its northernmost part, for the withdrawal of the sea consequent to the continuous enlargement of the port, it is very backward compared to the sea shore. Concludes at the Salvo D'Acquisto roundabout in Porto d'Ascoli for a total length of about 6 km.

It is bordered by lush gardens, a pine forest, tennis courts, a skating rink and a building, the "Palazzina Azzurra", the city's local historian, on the mouth of the Albula stream that determines the end of the first stretch, to the south of which the most touristy area, with beachside resorts on one side and villas and hotels on the other side of the road. A peculiar feature of the waterfront is the abundant presence of palm trees (mainly Phoenix canariensis and Phoenix sylvestris) which have become a bit of a city symbol (today, between public and private gardens and along the city avenues, there are a total of about 8,000 palm trees of various species) in the tourist sense, having taken the same tourist promotion company the name of Riviera delle Palme.

In 2001 the cycle path was completed which is a single walk to Cupra Marittima to the north and to Porto d'Ascoli to the south. The southern part of the waterfront has been subject to interventions at different times. In 2004, a radical reconstruction was launched which saw the modernization of the first part of the southern promenade: both the pedestrian area and the cycle path were extended. Then in 2007 the 2nd section was inaugurated. The cycle path is part of the larger project called Ciclovia Adriatica which once completed will connect the entire Adriatic coast.

In addition to the pedestrian area and the cycle path, there are "thematic gardens", the "oases": arid garden, wet garden, palm garden, rose garden, Mediterranean bush garden. The materials chosen are compatible with the new vocation of the waterfront in order to make these features look like real natural spaces on the sea, where to stop to admire the view, or for direct access to the beach. On the official website of the Municipality it is possible to admire the photos of the new waterfront and also make a virtual tour. In 2016, work began on the redevelopment of the northern promenade, which extends for about 2 km and goes from the "Palazzo Las Vegas" to the Albula stream.

Riviera delle Palme

The "Riviera delle Palme" is a beach located in San Benedetto del Tronto. It has annually been awarded a Blue Flag since 1998. The Blue Flag is a certification awarded to beaches and marinas by the Foundation for Environmental Education which qualify with its environmental standards.

Economy

Fishing
San Benedetto del Tronto has become, over the centuries, a fishing and tourist center of primary national importance. In 1912 the launch of a motorized fish-carrier began a process of transformation of the propulsion of the ships that, from the sail, reached the ocean fishing vessels. Alongside these events there have also been modernizations and developments also in other sectors directly linked to maritime activities, such as shipbuilding, hemp processing, cable and network construction, naval workshops, on-board instrumentation, fish marketing (San Benedetto boasts the most important wholesale fish market in Italy), the cold chains for the transport of fish.

Although in continuous decline, this sector remains a driving force for the local economy if we do not consider only the properly maritime part (note that San Benedetto del Tronto is the second Italian port, behind Mazara del Vallo, for quantity of fish caught and number of fishing boats and one of the largest fish markets in Italy) but all related industries are taken into account and above all the highly developed canning industry which, established to support the marketing of fish, now operates on all food products, mainly fruit and vegetables. In San Benedetto del Tronto we also find a vocational training center for offshore fishing workers.

Tourism 

The tourism represents the most important item of the city income. San Benedetto has established itself, since the early decades of the twentieth century, as a popular seaside resort. Since the second half of the sixties, it has also established itself as the first tourist destination of Marche in terms of number of presences.

It boasts the Blue Flag of the European Community and invests in promoting and consolidating an image acquired not only nationally. This image has been conveyed, for about a decade, with the mark "Riviera delle Palme", a name which, sharing them under the same Tourism Promotion Company, also encompasses the other two countries bordering the southernmost part of Province of Ascoli Piceno, Grottammare and Cupra Marittima, as well as some villages in the San Benedetto area, Offida, Monteprandone, Acquaviva Picena, Ripatransone and the Lazio municipality of Accumoli (joined the consortium in 2008).

Gastronomy

Typical local cuisine
San Benedetto is in fact the home of "Brodetto alla sambenedettese", a Fish soup that differs from other recipes in the addition of Bell pepper and Vinegar. It is unique in its kind and has existed, according to the locals, "since the fishermen exist".

Drinks
As far as alcohol is concerned, the whole area of Province of Ascoli Piceno is known for the production of Rosso Piceno Superiore, Falerio, Rosso Piceno, Passerina, Vino cotto and  Il Caffè del Marinaio , an ancient recipe of the fishermen of San Benedetto del Tronto.

Transport

San Benedetto del Tronto can be reached by various means:

Motorways 
Motorway A14 (Bologna - Taranto), from the south exit San Benedetto - Ascoli Piceno, north side exit Grottammare. From Rome, take the A24 (Rome - L'Aquila) to the end, then follow to Giulianova until reaching the A14: From Florence you can exit at the Valdichiana exit of the A1 and then follow several highways, Perugia - Foligno, Muccia, Macerata - Civitanova Marche, San Benedetto del Tronto. The alternative from Florence is to exit the Orte tollbooth and follow the highways crossing Terni, Foligno, the Sibillini Mountains and Ancona.

Rail
The San Benedetto del Tronto train station is connected to lines that connect it to Milan - Bologna - Ancona - Lecce and also Rome - Falconara Marittima  - Ancona.

Bus 
There are several regional bus companies that connect San Benedetto del Tronto to the main cities of the center, including Rome (Rome Marche lines and Start).

Airport
The nearest airports are the Marche Airport (Raffaello Sanzio of Ancona - Falconara) and the one of Abruzzo Airport in Pescara.

Ship 
The nearest port is in Ancona.

Cycle paths

The city has a large number of cycle paths, so much so that it is possible to follow it without interruption from the north (where it has a connection with the Grottammare cycle path) to the south (plunging into the Sentina Park).
From 2001 to 2010, the section that completes a single walk up to Cupra Marittima was completed by extending the long Green Adriatic Corridor.
In the coming years the construction of a bridge over the river Tronto is planned, which will make possible the connection between the cycle path inside the Sentina and the waterfront track of Martinsicuro (TE).

At the central railway station and the Sentina natural reserve there is a free Bicycle-sharing system, for tourists and residents, called  C'entro in Bici .
The San Benedetto del Tronto cycle path is part of the Green Adriatic Corridor, the bike path that runs along the Adriatic coast and crosses five regions from Emilia-Romagna to Apulia.  From the Ciclovia Adriatica (near the Sentina regional nature reserve) the Ciclovia Salaria branches off, a cycling route that, once completed, will go to connect Adriatic coast with Rome and the coast tirrenica (to Ostia) closely following the route of the ancient Via Salaria.

Sport

Football
San Benedetto del Tronto is home to the football team S.S. Sambenedettese Calcio. The team has played in Serie B and is currently playing in Lega Pro.

Beach Soccer
The Sambenedettese Beach Soccer company, runs the Serie A, of the Italian beach soccer championship. He won: the Scudetto in 2014 and 2017, the Italian Cup, in 2013 and 2017, the Super Cup in 2014, 2015 and 2017.

Cycling
In March, the city hosts the final stage finish of the Tirreno–Adriatico bicycle race.

Tennis
San Benedetto also hosts the San Benedetto Tennis Cup (a Challenger Tour tennis event) every July that attracts some of the world's best players.

Skating
In 2010 the municipality hosted the European Inline Speed Skating Championships; in 2011 the Italian championships.

Notable people
Marco Amabili is a researcher in mechanical engineering wo received significant international recognitions.
Nando Angelini (1933 - 2020), was an Italian actor.
Riccardo Bugari (1991), is an Italian speed skater. He competed in the 2018 Winter Olympics.
Pierluigi Camiscioni (1953 - 2020), was an Italian rugby union player and stuntman.
Giovanni Carminucci (1939 - 2007),  was an Italian gymnast.
Pasquale Carminucci (1937 - 2015), was an Italian gymnast. He was the brother of Giovanni Carminucci and participated in three editions of the Summer Olympics, 1960, 1964 and 1968.
Enrica Cipolloni (1990), is an Italian female heptathlete, who won two national championships at individual senior level from 2014 to 2018.
Maurizio Compagnoni (1963), is an Italian journalist and sports commentator from Sky Sport.
Remo Croci (1957), is an Italian journalist from Mediaset Italia.
Paolo Consorti (1964), is an Italian artist and film director.
Ugo Crescenzi (1930 – 2017), was an Italian politician and member of the Christian Democrats (DC).
Giambattista Croci (1964), is a former Italian rugby union player. He played as a lock.
Camillo De Lellis (1976), is an Italian mathematician who is active in the fields of calculus of variations, hyperbolic systems of conservation laws, geometric measure theory and fluid dynamics.
Stefano Di Cola (1998), is an Italian swimmer. Is an athlete of the Gruppo Sportivo della Marina Militare.
Enzo Eusebi (1960) is an Italian engineer, architect and designer.
Massimo Fabbrizi (1977), is an Italian professional target shooter, is an athlete of the Centro Sportivo Carabinieri. He competed in the trap event at the 2012 Summer Olympics where he won the silver medal, an won 3 medals, 2 golds (2005,2011) and 1 silver (2009), you have ISSF World Shooting Championships.
Fabiana Fares (1972),  is an Italian modern pentathlete. She represented Italy at the 2000 Summer Olympics held in Sydney, Australia.
Daniele Giorgini (1984),  is an Italian professional tennis player.
Jessica Hélène Mattoni (1990), is an Italian gymnast.
Mudimbi (1986),  is an Italian singer and rapper.
Andrea Pazienza (1956 – 1988),  was an Italian comics artist and painter.
Andrea Rossi (1986), is an Italian footballer who plays as a defender.
Daphne Scoccia (1995), is an Italian actress.
Linda Valori (1976),  is an Italian singer.
Sebastiano Vecchiola (1970),  is a retired Italian football midfielder.

International relations

Twin towns – sister cities
San Benedetto del Tronto is twinned with:

 Alfortville, France
 Chicago Heights, United States
 Mar del Plata, Argentina
 Šibenik, Croatia
 Steyr, Austria
 Trinidad, Cuba
 Viareggio, Italy

See also
Porto d'Ascoli
Riviera delle Palme (Marche)
Roman Catholic Diocese of San Benedetto del Tronto-Ripatransone-Montalto

References

External links

Official website  
San Benedetto del Tronto Hotel Association
Riviera delle Palme San Benedetto del Tronto Hotel Association 

 
Cities and towns in the Marche
Coastal towns in the Marche
Port cities and towns of the Adriatic Sea
Seaside resorts in Italy